The Moses Lake Washington Temple is a temple of the Church of Jesus Christ of Latter-day Saints (LDS Church) under construction in Moses Lake, Washington. This will be the church's fourth temple in the state of Washington.

History
On April 7, 2019, during the church's general conference, church president Russell M. Nelson announced plans to construct the Moses Lake Washington Temple.

The temple's location was announced on October 29, 2019, on a 17-acre site located on Yonezawa Boulevard between Division Street and Road K NE.

On April 7, 2020, a rendering of the temple was released. Plans show a single-story temple of roughly 20,000 square feet with a center spire.

On September 11, 2020, the church announced that a groundbreaking, to signify the beginning of construction, would take place the following month.
The groundbreaking occurred on October 10, 2020, with David L. Stapleton, an area seventy, presiding.

On March 13, 2023, the church announced that a public open house will begin Friday, August 4, and run every day until Saturday, August 19, except for Sundays. The temple is then scheduled for dedication on September 17th, with Quentin L. Cook presiding.

See also 

 Comparison of temples of The Church of Jesus Christ of Latter-day Saints
 List of temples of The Church of Jesus Christ of Latter-day Saints
 List of temples of The Church of Jesus Christ of Latter-day Saints by geographic region
 Temple architecture (Latter-day Saints)
 The Church of Jesus Christ of Latter-day Saints in Washington

References

External links 
 Moses Lake Washington Temple page

20th-century Latter Day Saint temples
The Church of Jesus Christ of Latter-day Saints in Washington (state)
Religious buildings and structures in Washington (state)